The 1998 Fed Cup was the 36th edition of the most important competition between national teams in women's tennis. In the final, Spain defeated Switzerland at Palexpo Hall in Geneva, Switzerland on 19–20 September, giving Spain its fifth title.

World Group

Draw

World Group play-offs

The four losing teams in the World Group first round ties (Belgium, Czech Republic, Germany and Netherlands), and four winners of the World Group II ties (Croatia, Italy, Russia and Slovakia) entered the draw for the World Group play-offs.

Date: 25–26 July

World Group II

The World Group II was the second highest level of Fed Cup competition in 1998. Winners advanced to the World Group play-offs, and losers played in the World Group II play-offs.

Date: 18–19 April

World Group II play-offs

The four losing teams from World Group II (Argentina, Australia, Austria and Japan) played off against qualifiers from Zonal Group I. Two teams qualified from Europe/Africa Zone (Belarus and Poland), one team from the Asia/Oceania Zone (South Korea), and one team from the Americas Zone (Venezuela).

Date: 12–13 July

Americas Zone

 Nations in bold advanced to the higher level of competition.
 Nations in italics were relegated down to a lower level of competition.

Group I
Venue: Tennis Academy, Brasília, Brazil (outdoor clay)

Dates: 14–17 April

Participating Teams

Group II
Venue: Chipinque Racquet Club, Monterrey, Mexico (outdoor clay)

Dates: 27 April – 3 May

Participating Teams

Asia/Oceania Zone

 Nations in bold advanced to the higher level of competition.
 Nations in italics were relegated down to a lower level of competition.

Group I
Venue: Thana City Golf Club, Samutpakarn, Thailand (outdoor hard)

Dates: 16–20 February

Participating Teams

Group II
Venue: Thana City Golf Club, Samutpakarn, Thailand (outdoor hard)

Dates: 16–20 February

Participating Teams

 
 
 
 
 Pacific Oceania

Europe/Africa Zone

 Nations in bold advanced to the higher level of competition.
 Nations in italics were relegated down to a lower level of competition.

Group I
Venue: La Manga Club, Murcia, Spain (outdoor clay)

Dates: 14–18 April

Participating Teams

Group II
Venue: Ali Bey Club, Manavgat, Turkey (outdoor clay)

Dates: 5–9 May

Participating Teams

External links 
 Fed Cup

 
Billie Jean King Cups by year
Fed
1998 in women's tennis